Park Drive is a cricket ground in Hartlepool, England. Although the ground used to host two or three Durham 1st XI matches each season between 1992 (when the county received first-class status) and 1997, the ground has not been used since for county matches.

The ground has hosted 8 first-class matches and 11 List A matches.

Game Information
{| class="wikitable"
|-
! Game Type
! No. of Games
|-
| County Championship Matches
| 8
|-
| limited-over county matches
| 9
|-
| Twenty20 matches
| 0
|}

Game Statistics: first-class
{| class="wikitable"
|-
! Category
! Information
|-
| Highest Team Score
| Durham (545/8dec against Northamptonshire) in 1994
|-
| Lowest Team Score
| Northamptonshire (156 against Durham) in 1994
|-
| Best Batting Performance
| John Morris (186 Runs for Durham against Northamptonshire in 1994
|-
| Best Bowling Performance
| Alan Walker (7/56 for Durham against Nottinghamshire) in 1997
|}

Game Statistics: one-day matches
{| class="wikitable"
|-
! Category
! Information
|-
| Highest Team Score
| Northamptonshire (266/3 in 40 overs against Durham) in 1994 and Durham (266/6 in 40 overs against Northamptonshire) in 1994
|-
| Lowest Team Score
| Minor Counties (156 in 55 overs against Durham) in 1993
|-
| Best Batting Performance
| Alan Fordham (111 Runs for Northamptonshire against Durham) in 1994
|-
| Best Bowling Performance
| Roland Lefebvre (4/23 for Glamorgan against Durham) in 1994
|}

External links
 Cricinfo Website - Ground Page
 Cricket Archive page

Cricket grounds in County Durham
Sport in Hartlepool